Guy Vandersmissen (born 25 December 1957) is a retired Belgian footballer.

During his career he played for R. Standard de Liège, K.F.C. Germinal Ekeren, and R.W.D. Molenbeek. He earned 17 caps for the Belgium national football team, and participated in the 1982 FIFA World Cup.

Honours

Club 
Standard Liège

 Belgian First Division: 1981–82, 1982–83
 Belgian Cup: 1980–81 (winners), 1987–88, 1988–89 (runners-up)
 Belgian Super Cup: 1981, 1983
 European Cup Winners' Cup: 1981–82 (runners-up)
 Intertoto Cup Group Winners: 1980, 1982

References

External links
 

1957 births
Living people
Belgian footballers
Belgium international footballers
Belgian football managers
1982 FIFA World Cup players
Standard Liège players
Beerschot A.C. players
Belgian Pro League players
R.W.D. Molenbeek players
R.W.D. Molenbeek managers
Association football midfielders
People from Tongeren
Footballers from Limburg (Belgium)